Lee is a 2017 Indian-Kannada-language action film written by H. M. Srinandan. It was produced by Sarathy Sathish for Vivid Dreams Entertainment, with cinematography by Nandakumar. Its lead actors include Sumanth Shailendra and Nabha Natesh. Sneha Namdhani debuts as the second lead.

The film score was composed by Gurukiran while the soundtrack was composed by Anand Rajavikraman. The filming began in January 2016 and it was launched at the Kanteerava Indoor Stadium in Bangalore, India.

Cast
 Sumanth Shailendra as Charlee
 Nabha Natesh as Leela
 Sneha Namdhani
 Sadhu Kokila
 Rahul Dev
 Achyuth Kumar
 Rangayana Raghu
 Suchendra Prasad
 Chikkanna
 Tabla Nani
 Jayashankar
 Master OM
 Sanil

Soundtrack

Newcomer Anand Rajavikraman composed the soundtrack music.

Critical reception

The film received 2.5 out of 5 stars from Sunayana Suresh of Times Of India, who mentioned: "It can be watched once by those who like mass stories mixed with romance and drama."

References

External links
 'Lee' official teaser

2017 films
2010s Kannada-language films
Indian action films
Films scored by Gurukiran
2017 action films